The 1970 FIVB Women's World Championship was the sixth edition of the tournament, organised by the world's governing body, the FIVB. It was held from 22 September to 2 October 1970 in Bulgaria.

Teams

Squads

Venues

Source:

Format
The tournament was played in two different stages (first and final rounds). A single round-robin format was played within each group to determine the teams group position, all teams progressed to the next round.

A single round-robin format was played within each group with matches already played between teams in the  also counted in this round.

Pools composition

Results

First round

Pool A
Location: Sevlievo

|}

|}

Pool B
Location: Sofia

|}

|}

Pool C
Location: Burgas

|}

|}

Pool D
Location: Varna

|}

|}

Final round
The results and the points of the matches between the same teams that were already played during the first round are taken into account for the final round.

9th–16th places
Location: Burgas

|}

|}

Final places
Location: Varna

|}

|}

Final standing

References

External links
 FIVB Results
 Results - todor66
 Results
 Federation Internationale de Volleyball

FIVB Women's World Championship
International volleyball competitions hosted by Bulgaria
1970
1970 in Bulgarian women's sport
Sport in Varna, Bulgaria
September 1970 sports events in Europe
October 1970 sports events in Europe
Women's volleyball in Bulgaria